Deodara is a census town in Mandla district in the state of Madhya Pradesh, India. It is an extended part of Mandla city.
It connects the city centre to the local tourist spot of Shehestra Dhara, a holy site situated on the bank of Narmada river. Poor roads and no government water pipeline availability are some of the concerning issues of the locals residing here. There are many beautiful Ghats on the bank of River Narmada situated here like Gau Ghat and Chakrateerath Gath.It is considered as an urban panchayat which is part of Mandla city.

Demographics

Males constitute 52% of the population and females 48%. Deodara has an average literacy rate of 91%, higher than the national average of 74%: male literacy is 95% and, female literacy is 84%. In Deodara, 13% of the population is under 6 years of age.

References

Cities and towns in Mandla district
Mandla